Graham Kendall, FORS, FBCS (born 21 July 1961) is a Professor of Computer Science at the University of Nottingham, UK. He is currently (2016–present) the Provost and CEO of University of Nottingham Malaysia Campus. He is also a Pro-Vice Chancellor of the University.

He is a member of the Automated Scheduling, Optimisation and Planning (ASAP) Research Group within the School of Computer Science.

He is the Editor-in-Chief of the IEEE Transactions of Computational Intelligence and AI in Games.

References

External links
 Graham Kendall's home page.

1961 births
Living people
Malaysian mathematicians
Malaysian academics
British computer scientists
Artificial intelligence researchers
Academics of the University of Nottingham